The diocese of Nepi-Sutri was a Roman Catholic ecclesiastical territory in central Italy, created in 1435 by unifying the diocese of Nepi and the diocese of Sutri. It existed until 1986, when it was united into the current diocese of Cività Castellana.

History

In the Gothic War Nepi was one of the last strongholds of the Goths. The town was sacked by the Lombards in 569. In the eighth century, however, it became the seat of Tuto, a Lombard dux, known for his interference in the papal election of 768.

In the struggle between the emperors and the popes, Nepi was imperialist during the reigns of Pope Alexander II, Pope Nicholas II, Pope Gregory VII, and Pope Innocent II; on the other hand, in 1160, it fought against the commune of Rome, and in 1244, was besieged by Emperor Frederick II. A feudal possession, first of the prefects of Vico, and then of the Orsinis, of the Colonnas, and of C�sar Borgia, from 1537 to 1545, it was erected into a duchy in favour of Peter Louis Farnese; and when the latter was transferred to Parma, Nepi returned to immediate dependence on the Holy See. In 1798 the French set fire to the cathedral and to the episcopal palace, and archives were lost.

The Church of Nepi, which venerates, as its evangelizer, St. Ptolemaeus, who, it is claimed, was a disciple of the Apostles. In 419, Eulalius, competitor of Pope Boniface I, was made Bishop of Nepi; Bishop Paulus was sent as visitor to Naples by Gregory the Great; Bishop Stephanus, in 868, was one of the presidents and papal legates of the Council of Constantinople against Photius.

Sutri is placed on the Cassian Way. The cathedral is of the thirteenth century, modernized by frequent alterations. Santa Maria della Grotta is an interesting church. The history of Sutri in antiquity resembles that of Nepi, for Sutri also was taken by the Lombards in 569, but was retaken by the exarch Romanus; Liutprand likewise took the town in 726, but in the following year restored it to "St. Peter". As the city is on the Cassian Way not far from Rome, it was, as a rule, the last halting-place of the German emperors on their way to the city, and sometimes they received there the papal legate. The Synod of Sutri was held there in 1046.

This town has an ancient Christian cemetery where the body of St. Romanus was found, who is the patron of the city; the cathedral possesses a statue of him by Gian Lorenzo Bernini. Among the martyrs of Sutri is St. Felix (about 275). The first bishop of known date was Eusebius (465); other bishops were Martinus, or Marinus, who was sent as ambassador to Otho I in 963; Benedictus, who, in 975, became Pope Benedict VII; Bishop Bonitho (Bonizo), historian of the Gregorian epoch, who was driven from his diocese by the anti-papal faction and later was made Bishop of Piacenza.

The diocese was united to Nepi under Bishop Luke de Tartarts (1345); under Pomponius Cesi (1519), who became a cardinal, the cemetery of St. Savinilla was discovered; Michael Ghislieri (1556) became Pope Pius V; Joseph Chianti (1701) founded the seminary; Camillus Simeoni (1782) was exiled by the French and became a cardinal.

Ordinaries

Diocese of Nepi

Erected: 1st Century
Latin Name: Nepesinus

Pietro Dell'Orto (27 Apr 1433 – 12 Dec 1435 Appointed, Bishop of Corneto (Tarquinia) e Montefiascone)

Diocese of Nepi e Sutri
United: 12 December 1435 with Diocese of Sutri
Immediately Subject to the Holy See

Angelo Altieri (30 Apr 1453 – 1472 Died)
...
Bartolomeo Flores (21 Aug 1489 – 5 Aug 1495 Appointed, Archbishop of Cosenza)
Antonio Torres (bishop), O.S.H. (17 Apr 1497 – Jun 1497 Died)
Antonio Alberici (11 Oct 1503 – 1506 Died)
Gian Giacomo Bruni (6 Feb 1506 – 1507 Resigned)
Paolo Emilio Bruni (27 Aug 1507 – 1516 Died)
Giacomo Bongalli (5 Nov 1516 – 1538 Resigned)
Giacomo Simonetta (6 Feb 1538 – 1 Nov 1539 Died)
Pomponio Cecci (Cesi) (24 Nov 1539 – 4 Aug 1542 Died)
Pietro Antonio de Angelis (7 Aug 1542 – 1553 Died)
Antonio Simeoni, O.S.B. (3 Jul 1553 – 2 Sep 1556 Died)
Antonio Ghislieri, O.P. (4 Sep 1556 – 27 Mar 1560 Appointed, Bishop of Mondovi)
Girolamo Gallarati (27 Mar 1560 – 9 Jun 1564 Appointed, Bishop of Alessandria (della Paglia))
Tiberio Crispo (19 Jan 1565 – 6 Oct 1566 Died)
Egidio Valenti, O.S.A. (25 Oct 1566 – 9 May 1568 Died)
Camillo Campeggi, O.P. (14 May 1568 – 1569 Died)
Donato Stampa (14 Dec 1569 – 1575 Died)
Alessio Stradella, O.S.A. (20 Jul 1575 – 27 Aug 1580 Died)
Orazio Moroni (5 Sep 1580 – 30 May 1603 Died)
Taddeo Sarti (31 May 1604 – 1616 Resigned)
Dionisio Martini, O.F.M. (18 May 1616 – Sep 1627 Died)
Sebastiano De Paoli (Sep 1627 – 17 Feb 1643 Died)
Bartolomeo Vannini (13 Jul 1643 – 1653 Died)
Marcello Anania (1 Jun 1654 – 25 Apr 1670 Died)
Giulio Spinola (2 Jun 1670 – 8 Nov 1677 Appointed, Archbishop (Personal Title) of Lucca)
Giacomo Buoni (28 Feb 1678 – 1679 Died)
Stefano Ricciardi (1 Sep 1681 – 1683 Died)
Francesco Juste Giusti (9 Apr 1685 – 23 Nov 1693 Appointed, Bishop of Camerino)
Savo Millini (Mellini) (17 May 1694 – 10 Feb 1701 Died)
Giuseppe Cianti (14 Mar 1701 – Nov 1708 Died)
Vincenzo Vecchiarelli (15 Apr 1709 – 24 Jan 1740 Died)
Francesco Vivani (11 Nov 1740 – 18 Apr 1746 Appointed, Bishop of Camerino)
Giacinto Silvestri (2 May 1746 – 22 Jul 1754 Appointed, Bishop of Orvieto)
Filippo Mornati (16 Sep 1754 – 8 Jun 1778 Died)
Girolamo Luigi Crivelli (28 Sep 1778 – 27 Nov 1780 Died)
Camillo de Simeoni (16 Dec 1782 – 2 Jan 1818 Died)
Anselmo Basilici (25 May 1818 – 5 Sep 1840 Died)
Francesco Spalletti (14 Dec 1840 – 12 Jan 1850 Died)
Gaspare Pitocchi (Petocchi) (20 May 1850 – 7 Aug 1855 Died)
Lorenzo Signani, O.F.M. Cap. (28 Sep 1855 – 2 Sep 1863 Died)
Giulio Lenti (22 Feb 1867 – 28 Jan 1876 Appointed, Auxiliary Bishop of Rome)
Giovanni Battista Paolucci (28 Jan 1876 – 15 Jul 1878 Appointed, Titular Archbishop of Hadrianopolis in Haemimonto)
Giuseppe Maria Costantini (Constantini) (15 Jul 1878 – 1 Jun 1891 Resigned)
Generoso Mattei (1 Jun 1891 – 9 Jan 1900 Died)
Bernardo Giuseppe Doebbing, O.F.M. (2 Apr 1900 – 14 Mar 1916 Died)
Luigi Olivares, S.D.B. (15 Jul 1916 – 19 May 1943 Died)
Giuseppe Gori (17 Aug 1943 – 2 Jul 1969 Died)
Marcello Rosina (10 Aug 1974 – 11 Feb 1986 Appointed, Bishop of Civita Castellana (Orte, Gallese, Nepi e Sutri))

References
Cappelletti, Le Chiese d'Italia, V
Ranchiasci, Memorie storiche della città di Nepi, etc. (Todi, 1845–47)
Nispi-Landi, L'antica città di Sutri (Rome, 1887)

Notes

External links
New Advent

Nepi
Religious organizations established in the 1430s
1435 establishments in Europe
15th-century establishments in Italy
Nepi
1986 disestablishments in Italy